Frances O'Halloran (born 25 January 1934) is a Canadian sprinter. She competed in the women's 200 metres at the 1952 Summer Olympics.

References

External links
 

1934 births
Living people
Athletes (track and field) at the 1952 Summer Olympics
Canadian female sprinters
Olympic track and field athletes of Canada
Athletes from Toronto
Olympic female sprinters